Gong Hwang-cherng (1934–2010) was a Taiwanese linguist who specialized in Sino-Tibetan comparative linguistics and the phonetic reconstruction of Tangut and Old Chinese.

He was born on 10 December 1934 at Yunlin County in Taiwan, and graduated from National Taiwan Normal University in 1958 with a degree in English. He earned his PhD in 1975 from Ludwig Maximilian University of Munich in Germany, and was a research fellow and later professor at Academia Sinica in Taiwan. He was elected an honorary member of the Linguistic Society of America in 2001, and an academician of Academia Sinica in 2002. In 2006, he received a life achievement award from the Linguistic Society of Taiwan.

Works
 Gong Huang-cherng  (1977). "y  guzangwen de y ji qixiangguan wenti [Ancient Tibetan y and related questions]." Bulletin of the Institute of History and Philology, Academia Sinica 48.2 :205-228. (reprinted in) Gong Hwang-cherng  (2002).  Hanzangyu yanjiulun wenji / Collected Papers on Sino-Tibetan Linguistics. Taipei:  Zhong yang yan jiu yuan yuyanxue yanjiusuo choubeichu: 379–399.
 Gong Hwang-cherng (1980). "A Comparative Study of the Chinese, Tibetan, and Burmese Vowel Systems." Bulletin of the Institute of History and Philology 51.3: 455–490. (reprinted in:)  Hanzangyu yanjiulun wenji / Collected Papers on Sino-Tibetan Linguistics. Taipei:  Zhong yang yan jiu yuan yuyanxue yanjiusuo choubeichu, 2002: 1–30.
 Gong Hwang-cherng (1995). "The System of Finals in Proto-Sino-Tibetan". The Ancestry of the Chinese Language. William S.-Y. Wang, ed. (Journal of Chinese linguistics. Monograph series 8) Berkeley: Project on Linguistic Analysis, University of California: 41–92. (reprinted in:)  Hanzangyu yanjiulun wenji / Collected Papers on Sino-Tibetan Linguistics. Taipei:  Zhong yang yan jiu yuan yuyanxue yanjiusuo choubeichu, 2002: 79–124.
 Gong Hwang-cherng  (1999).  [Tense vowels and their origin in Xixia].  [Collected Papers of the Institute of History and Philology of Academia Sinica] 70.2: 531–558.
 Gong Hwang-cherng  (2001).  [Rime transformation and person agreement in Xixia verbs].  [Language and Linguistics] 2.1: 21–67.

References

External links
 Coblin, W. South (2003). "A Recent Contribution to Sino-Tibetan Linguistics (Review Article)", Language and Linguistics 4(4):887–902.  A review of Gong's Collected Papers on Sino-Tibetan Linguistics.
 Miyake, Marc (2004). "Gong Hwang-cherng: Han-Zang yu yanjiu lun wenji", Cahiers de linguistique – Asie orientale 33(1):113–121.  Another review of Collected Papers on Sino-Tibetan Linguistics.

Chinese sinologists
Tangutologists
Linguists from Taiwan
1934 births
2010 deaths